George Thew Burke (1776 – February 2, 1854) was a soldier, merchant and political figure in Upper Canada.

He was born in Ballyartella, County Tipperary, Ireland in 1776. He was a captain in the British Army serving in Canada from 1811 to 1818; he fought under Major General Isaac Brock at the Battle of Queenston Heights. In 1818, he became head of the settlement at Richmond, where a number of members of the army had received free land grants, and he set up a store there. He served in the Carleton militia and was named colonel in 1822. He became a justice of the peace in the Johnstown District in 1819 and in the Bathurst District in 1822. He represented Carleton in the Legislative Assembly of Upper Canada from 1824 to 1828. He died in Bytown in 1854

References 
Becoming Prominent: Leadership in Upper Canada, 1791-1841, J.K. Johnson (1989)

1776 births
1854 deaths
Irish emigrants to pre-Confederation Ontario
Members of the Legislative Assembly of Upper Canada
Politicians from County Tipperary
Immigrants to Upper Canada
Canadian justices of the peace